Sarıtala (also, Sarytala) is a village and municipality in the Tovuz Rayon of Azerbaijan. It has a population of 615. The municipality consists of the villages of Sarıtala and Dondarlı.

References 

Populated places in Tovuz District